France Ačko (July 23, 1904 in Maribor – December 30, 1974 in Ljubljana) was a Slovenian musician, organist and composer of sacred music. He studied music with Srečko Koporc and in Rome at the Pontifical Institute of Sacred Music. His most important works include a Missa Solemnis (1941) and Počivaj, Milo Detece (Sleep, Little Baby).

References 
 Slovenski veliki leksikon, Mladinska knjiga (2003)

1904 births
1974 deaths
Slovenian composers
Male composers
Musicians from Maribor
20th-century composers
Slovenian male musicians